The 2022–23 NEC Nijmegen season is the club's 123rd season in existence and the club's second consecutive season in the top flight of Dutch football. In addition to the domestic league, NEC will participate in this season's edition of the KNVB Cup. The season covers the period from 1 July 2022 to 30 June 2023.

Players

First-team squad

Pre-season and friendlies

Competitions

Overall record

Eredivisie

League table

Results summary

Results by round

Matches 
The league fixtures were announced on 17 June 2022.

KNVB Cup

References 

NEC Nijmegen
NEC Nijmegen